Gʻuzor District is a district of Qashqadaryo Region in Uzbekistan. The capital lies at Gʻuzor. The district consists of one city (Gʻuzor), 5 urban-type settlements (Jarariq, Obihayot, Yangikent, Sherali, Mash'al) and 12 rural communities.

References

Qashqadaryo Region
Districts of Uzbekistan